"Flores" is the ninth single by Titãs. It was released in 1989 on WEA. A completely reworked acoustic version of the song was later featured on their Acústico MTV live album, with Branco Mello sharing vocals with Marisa Monte. The chorus riff (used in the opening of the Acústico MTV version) was composed by drummer Charles Gavin, one of the song's co-writers.

Music video
The music video of "Flores" won the 1990 MTV Video Music Brasil award. It shows the band performing the song among flowers and shadows that float around the members.

Track listing

References 

1989 singles
Titãs songs
Warner Music Group singles
1989 songs
Songs written by Sérgio Britto
Songs written by Paulo Miklos
Songs written by Tony Bellotto